You're Not Alone is an EP by rock band Semisonic. Released on September 18, 2020, it is the band's first collection of new material in 19 years following their hiatus after touring 2001's All About Chemistry. The EP was preceded by the release of its title track on June 26, 2020.

Background
Though largely inactive since 2001, Semisonic never broke up and over the years would still get together to play occasional shows that usually took place in their hometown of Minneapolis. However, despite lead singer and main songwriter Dan Wilson's successful career as a songwriter and producer for the likes of Dixie Chicks and Adele and as a solo artist, he found it difficult to write new material that sounded like Semisonic.

It was when he met Liam Gallagher in 2017 with the prospect of writing songs for the former Oasis and Beady Eye singer that Wilson found inspiration for Semisonic again. Though ultimately he and Gallagher did not work together, Wilson felt that the songs he set out to write for Gallagher were more suitable for Semisonic instead. Over the next two years, Wilson's bandmates John Munson and Jacob Slichter would record the new material during a couple of sessions at his house in Los Angeles.

In July 2019, Semisonic gave live debuts to the new songs "You’re Not Alone", "Basement Tapes" and "All It Would Take" at two shows they played in Milwaukee and Minneapolis. In between those two dates, the band also recorded the songs in a live session for Minnesota Public Radio's The Current. By the end of the year, Semisonic had finished mixing their new EP.

Singles
The EP's first single was its title track. Released on June 26, 2020, “You’re Not Alone”
reached #12 on the AAA charts. “As radio-ready as “Closing Time,” the kind of hook-filled
pop confection at which Wilson excels, with a stirring, consoling message for the current
rocky times.”

Follow-up single “Basement Tapes” — “A blazingly catchy and colorful rocker that could be
about the nascent days of any rock band”  — was released to radio on September 18, 2020
(the day of the EP release).

Critical reception
Rolling Stone's review declared You're Not Alone “returns to the trio’s blend of winsome
melodies, power-chord guitars and largely angst-free lyrics.”
In the Minneapolis Star Tribune, music critic Chris Riemenschneider wrote, “The collection
sounds as timeless musically as it does right-on-time lyrically. . . Twenty-two years after
releasing “Closing Time,” Semisonic — like its trademark song — has endured and maybe
even grown in stature.” 

On NPR’s New Music Friday, critic Ann Powers hailed the release. “The wonderful indie
band is back with their first music in nineteen years.” 

Gwen Inhat of The A.V. Club called out the release as one of five the outlet loved for the
week with the songwriting and vocal performances. “It seems that lightning can indeed strike
twice, even after almost 20 years.”

Track listing

References

2020 EPs
Semisonic EPs
Self-released EPs
Albums produced by Dan Wilson (musician)